Sun Baojie (born 2 January 1965) is a retired Chinese football referee. He is also a teacher of Tsinghua University.

He has refereed internationally in the AFC Asian Cup, Tiger Cup, and qualifiers for the 1998, 2006, and 2010 World Cups. Sun officiated the 2001 FIFA World Youth Championship, taking charge of the opening match between Argentina and Finland. He is also a referee at the AFC Champions League and Chinese Super League. During 1999, Sun also spent a stint in Major League Soccer as part of a referee exchange program.

After reaching the FIFA age limit and retiring as a match official, Sun has served as a member of the Refereeing Committee of the Asian Football Confederation.

References

1965 births
Chinese football referees
Living people
People from Jinzhong
Beijing Sport University alumni
Academic staff of Tsinghua University
AFC Asian Cup referees
Major League Soccer referees